Diplomatic History is a peer-reviewed academic journal covering the foreign relations history of the United States. It is the official journal of the Society for Historians of American Foreign Relations and is published by Oxford University Press. The journal was established in 1977. From 2014-2019 the editors-in-chief were Nick Cullather (Indiana University) and Anne L. Foster (Indiana State University). Since July 2019, the editors-in-chief are Anne L. Foster and Petra Goedde (Temple University).

According to the Journal Citation Reports, the journal has a 2020 impact factor of 0.529.

References

External links 
 

History of the United States journals
International relations journals
Oxford University Press academic journals
English-language journals
Publications established in 1977
5 times per year journals